Delfin is a Spanish surname of Italian origin, which means "dolphin". Variants of the name include Delfini, Dolfin, and Delfino. The name may refer to:

Giovanni Dolfin, 57th Doge of Venice.
Flaminio Delfín, 16th century commander of the Papal Armies.
Daniel Delfín, 17th century cardinal of the Catholic Church.
Daniel Andrea Delfín, 18th century Statesman and diplomat.
Juan María Delfín, 18th century captain of the Spanish Armada.
Remigio Delfín, 20th century Mexican naval businessman and diplomat.
Eusebio Delfín, Cuban banker and musician.

See also
Delfin (disambiguation)

References

Spanish-language surnames